Nick or Nicholas Scott may refer to:

Nick Scott (rugby union) (born 1990), English rugby union player
Nick Scott (American football) (born 1995), American football player
Nick Scott (bodybuilder), American bodybuilder
Nicholas Scott (1933–2005), British politician